Song of the Flame is a 1930 American pre-Code musical film photographed entirely in Technicolor. It was produced and distributed by First National Pictures. It was the first color film to feature a widescreen sequence, using a process called Vitascope, the trademark name for Warner Bros.' widescreen process. The film, based on the 1925 Broadway musical of the same name, was nominated for an Academy Award for Sound Recording (George Groves). It is part of the tradition of operetta films, popular at the time.

Plot

Aniuta (Bernice Claire), known as The Flame, is a peasant girl who incites the people against the Czarist regime and the aristocracy through singing. Prince Volodya (Alexander Gray) is the leader of a group of Cossack troops who falls in love with the girl, even though she is part of a revolution that is opposed to his social class. Konstantin (Noah Beery) is a revolutionary who also falls in love with Aniuta, much to the anger of his lover, Natasha (Alice Gentle).

The revolutionaries succeed in overthrowing the regime, leaving the Prince and his aristocratic class in peril for their lives and fortunes. Konstantin becomes the new leader and his brutal treatment of the people make many regret having supported the revolution in the first place. After he attempts to seduce her, Aniuta flees to a village in her native Poland. The Prince, fleeing from the new regime, happens to arrive at the same village. When he meets the girl again, he decides to stay. They put their political differences aside and become romantically involved.

Hearing from his spies that the Prince is at a Polish village, Konstantin immediately goes there and arrests him, announcing that he attends to execute him. Aniuta desperately attempts to free the Prince by agreeing to have sex with Konstantin. The Prince is released from prison through this ruse, but when it is discovered that she had no intention of keeping her side of the bargain, she is thrown into jail. The Prince disguises himself and attempts to free the girl, but he is discovered and imprisoned again. Before they can be executed, Natasha, revealing the real reason behind Konstantin's execution order, tells the troops to release both the Prince and Aniuta. Konstantin is arrested by the troops soon after as a traitor to the revolution, and is executed, leaving the Prince and the girl free to pursue their romance.

Cast

 Alexander Gray as Prince Volodya
 Bernice Claire as Aniuta, The Flame
 Noah Beery as Konstantin
 Alice Gentle as Natasha
 Bert Roach as Count Boris
 Inez Courtney as Grusha
 Shep Camp as Officer
 Ivan Linow as Konstanin's Pal
 Janina Smolinska as Dancer (uncredited)

Cast notes:
Noah Beery was widely praised for his deep bass voice, which he first exhibited in this film in the song "One Little Drink." This song was satirized in the Bosko cartoon entitled: The Booze Hangs High (1930). Based on the success of this song, Warner Bros. subsequently cast Beery in a number of musical films, most notably in Golden Dawn (1930). The public was so enthralled by his singing abilities that Brunswick Records hired Beery to record songs from both of these films which were issued in their popular series.

Songs
"Song of the Flame" – words by Otto Harbach and Oscar Hammerstein II, music by George Gershwin
"Cossack Love Song" – words by Otto Harbach and Oscar Hammerstein II, music by Herbert Stothart and George Gershwin 
"One Little Drink" – words by Grant Clarke, music by Harry Akst
"When Love Calls" – words by Grant Clarke, music by Eddie Ward

Source:

Preservation
The film is believed to be lost. Only the soundtrack, which was recorded separately on Vitaphone disks, survives. All nine songs are preserved in the sound disc performances. There were four choruses as well, three of traditional Russian folk tunes and one drawn from Tchaikovsky's The Nutcracker.

Stage musical
The stage musical the film is based on opened on Broadway at the 44th Street Theatre on December 30, 1925 and closed on July 10, 1926 after 219 performances. the music was by Herbert P. Stothart and George Gershwin, with lyrics by Otto Harbach and Oscar Hammerstein II, and  book by Otto Harbach and Oscar Hammerstein II.  The musical was directed by Frank Reicher, dances and ensemble pictures were arranged by Jack Haskell, and the scenic design was by Joseph Urban. The cast included Phoebe Brune as Natasha, Greek Evans as Konstantin, Tessa Kosta as Aniuta ("The Flame"), and the 52-member Russian Art Choir.

Looney Tunes connection
Song Of The Flame is notable as the film that was accompanied in its initial release by Warner Bros.' first ever Looney Tunes cartoon short, Sinkin' in the Bathtub.

See also
List of lost films
List of incomplete or partially lost films
List of early color feature films

References
Notes

Further reading
Coles, David (2001) Magnified Grandeur: The Big Screen, 1926-31

External links

1930 films
1930s color films
1930 lost films
Lost American films
First National Pictures films
Warner Bros. films
American films based on plays
1930 musical films
Films directed by Alan Crosland
Films set in the Russian Empire
1925 musicals
Broadway musicals
American musical films
Operetta films
Early color films
Russian Revolution films
Films set in Poland
1930s English-language films
1930s American films